Charlie Brown's Holiday Hits is a compilation album by jazz pianist Vince Guaraldi (credited to the Vince Guaraldi Trio) released by Fantasy Records in 1998. The album was the first of several posthumous releases containing a mix of previously released material in addition to nine previously unavailable songs featured in prime-time animated television specials based on the Peanuts comic strip by Charles M. Schulz.

Background
Vince Guaraldi died of a sudden heart attack on February 6, 1976, at age 47, having composed music scores for 16 Peanuts television specials and the feature film A Boy Named Charlie Brown. Despite the wealth of material Guaraldi recorded for these specials, only three album's worth of Peanuts songs were released during his lifetime: Jazz Impressions of A Boy Named Charlie Brown (1964), A Charlie Brown Christmas (1965) and Oh Good Grief! (1968).

After the 1996 tribute album Linus and Lucy: The Music of Vince Guaraldi by New Age pianist George Winston sparked renewed interest in Guaraldi's music, Fantasy Records assembled a compilation album in 1998, 22 years after Guaraldi's final Peanuts project (It's Arbor Day, Charlie Brown (1976)).

Charlie Brown's Holiday Hits contains a mix of previously released material featured on the Fantasy releases Jazz Impressions of A Boy Named Charlie Brown and A Charlie Brown Christmas plus unreleased music cues from the latter as well as It's the Great Pumpkin, Charlie Brown (1966), A Charlie Brown Thanksgiving (1973) and Be My Valentine, Charlie Brown (1975). Several music cues were sourced directly from the television audio tracks and were licensed for inclusion from Lee Mendelson Film Productions.

Fantasy also inadvertently included one non-Guaraldi track ("Joe Cool"), a composite of two music cues composed by Ed Bogas and Desirée Goyette for The Charlie Brown and Snoopy Show (CBS, 1983-85). The title bears no relation to the multiple renditions of "Joe Cool" composed by Guaraldi during his lifetime.

Critical reception
Guaraldi historian Derrick Bang commented that the newly released material "is a joy, although some of these cuts are a bit 'muddy', and they lack the polish and studio perfection of Fantasy's earlier releases; they have an unsweetened quality, and display the uneven volume, jump starts and slow fades that betray their probable origins from television audio tracks." AllMusic critic Cub Koda said the wealth of unreleased material was a "true goldmine" for fans.

Track listing
All songs written by Vince Guaraldi except where noted. Proper titles appear with incorrectly titled tracks in parenthesis

Tracks 1−3 and 9−11 are sourced directly from their respective television soundtracks and appear in mono.

Personnel
Vince Guaraldi – piano, electric keyboards
Monty Budwig – double bass ("Charlie Brown Theme", "Great Pumpkin Waltz", "Linus and Lucy")
Fred Marshall – double bass ("Christmas Time Is Here")
Puzzy Firth – double bass ("Air Music")
Seward McCain – electric bass ("Heartburn Waltz", "Charlie's Blues", "Thanksgiving Theme")
Colin Bailey – drums ("Charlie Brown Theme", "Great Pumpkin Waltz", "Linus and Lucy")
Jerry Granelli – drums ("Christmas Time Is Here")
Mike Clark – drums ("Thanksgiving Theme")
Vince Lateano – drums ("Heartburn Waltz")
Eddie Duran – guitar ("Air Music")
John Gray – guitar ("Great Pumpkin Waltz")
Tom Harrell – trumpet ("Thanksgiving Theme")
Emanuel Klein – trumpet ("Great Pumpkin Waltz")
Chuck Bennett – trombone ("Thanksgiving Theme")
Ronnie Lang – woodwinds ("Great Pumpkin Waltz")
Bill Fitch – congas ("Camptown Races")
Benny Velarde – timbales ("Camptown Races")

References

External links
 

1964 soundtrack albums
1965 soundtrack albums
1966 soundtrack albums
1973 soundtrack albums
1975 soundtrack albums
1998 compilation albums
Albums arranged by Vince Guaraldi
Vince Guaraldi albums
Vince Guaraldi soundtracks
Cool jazz soundtracks
Mainstream jazz soundtracks
Peanuts music
Television animation soundtracks
Vince Guaraldi compilation albums